Juninho (little Júnior) full name Osvaldo José Martins Júnior (born 7 July 1982) is a Brazilian footballer who currently plays for Japan Football League side ReinMeer Aomori FC.

Career
He also played for Marília.

He signed a 3-month contract in June 2007 for Brasilis.

In July 2015, Juninho went on trial with Azerbaijan Premier League side Kapaz PFK. Juninho leaving the club in May 2016, after the expiration of his contract.

Club statistics

References

External links

 CBF
Player profile

1982 births
Living people
Brazilian footballers
Brazilian expatriate footballers
Expatriate footballers in Japan
Association football midfielders
J1 League players
J2 League players
Japan Football League players
Shimizu S-Pulse players
Ventforet Kofu players
Sagan Tosu players
Expatriate footballers in Azerbaijan
Khazar Lankaran FK players
Kapaz PFK players
ReinMeer Aomori players
Clube Atlético Votuporanguense players
Comercial Futebol Clube (Ribeirão Preto) players
Brazilian expatriate sportspeople in Azerbaijan